Jimmy DiResta (born April 3, 1967) is a New York-based designer, artist, and video producer. He enrolled in the School of Visual Arts in 1986 and graduated in 1990 with a BFA degree.  In 1993, he formed a now-defunct toy design company/store called "DiResta" in the East Village which created Gurglin’ Gutz, a rubber toy replicating a miniature human organ. He went on to teach at the School of Visual Arts.

Career 
In 2003, DiResta served as set decorator and co-host on "Trash to Cash" with his brother, John DiResta, on Fox Television (FX Network). In 2006, he co-hosted Hammered with John & Jimmy DiResta, on HGTV. The show focused on the marriage of Jimmy's craftsmanship and John's humor. The show's tagline was "Jimmy can make anything and John can make anything funny." In 2009, Jimmy hosted "Against the Grain" on the DIY Network.

In 2011, he co-hosted Dirty Money with his brother, John,  on Discovery Channel. The DiResta brothers set out scouring every corner of New York City, from dumpsters to flea markets.

Since his TV career, he has entered the YouTube media business, publishing on the Make: and Core77 channel as well as his own. He co-hosts the weekly "Making It" podcast since October, 2014 together with David Picciuto and Bob Clagett.

In 2016, Make: published a book co-written by Jimmy DiResta and John Baichtal entitled "Workshop Mastery with Jimmy DiResta."

In 2017, DiResta traveled to California to be a part of NBC's Making It, hosted by Amy Poehler and Nick Offerman, as an on-camera helper. Rejecting the name, "The Master Helper", DiResta  wanted just to be referred to by name.

DiResta now has the nickname "Jimmy Two Shows" as both his podcast and the show share a name.

In 2022, DiResta comes back in a new show called "Making Fun" on  Netflix where he, and a his buddies (Jackman, Derek, Graz and Canadian Pat), make things concocted by the minds of children. From a taco spitting T-Rex, to a punching sneaker, DiResta and his buddies create unthinkable toys dreamed up by children who get to see their idea built.

References

External links
 
 
 
 
 

1967 births
Living people
American television personalities
George W. Hewlett High School alumni
School of Visual Arts alumni
School of Visual Arts faculty
People from The Five Towns, New York